Caparra Creek, a perennial stream of the Manning River catchment, is located in the Mid North Coast region of New South Wales, Australia.

Course and features
The river flows generally southeast before reaching its confluence with the Dingo Creek, northwest of Wingham. The river descends  over its  course.

See also

 List of rivers of Australia
 List of rivers in New South Wales (A-K)
 Rivers of New South Wales

References

External links
 

 

Rivers of New South Wales
Rivers of the Hunter Region
Mid North Coast
Mid-Coast Council